Dunbar Station is a pastoral lease that currently operates as a cattle station in Queensland, Australia. The homestead is located on the Burke Developmental Road, Maramie in the Shire of Carpentaria.

Description
The property is situated within the Nassau River catchment with both the Nassau and the Mitchell Rivers also flowing through the property. An additional 13 creeks and 8 lagoons are found on the property all useful for watering stock. The country is composed of flat open plains with the soil being grey clay loam derived from the Cainozoic age, sands of Quaternary age with other alluvium. The vegetation is low open eucalypt savannah surrounded by coarse grasses.

History
The property had been established at some time prior to 1883 on Ngundjan tribal lands and was owned by Thomas Hungerford and sons. The Hungerfords placed the  property on the market in 1889. It was stocked with 10,000 head of cattle at this time but it was estimated that it could carry up to 30,000 head.

By 1913 the property had been put up for auction by the mortgagees. Stocked with 12,297 cattle and 236 horses the property boasted a homestead, three branding yards, 12 tailing yards and two horse yards.

The station was sold in 1929 to J. S. Love of Townsville for £50,000. Love had also recently acquired other properties in the gulf area; Gainsford and the Valley of Lagoons Stations.

In 1954 the property was still owned by J. S. Love Estates and was being managed by John McRae. The  was stocked with approximately 20,000 cattle, all profits from the station were given to charity.
 
Don McDonald, the eldest son of Jim McDonald, acquired Dunbar in 1991. In 2007 Dunbar was still privately owned by the McDonald family and managed by Peter and Debra Hagan. Dunbar is currently owned by MDH, owned by the McDonald family, and is one of the company's 11 cattle stations throughout Queensland.

See also
List of ranches and stations
List of the largest stations in Australia

References

Stations (Australian agriculture)
Pastoral leases in Queensland
North West Queensland
Shire of Carpentaria